Puerto Rico Highway 65 (PR-65) is a short highway connecting Puerto Rico Highway PR-239, also locally known as Alfonso Valdés Cobián Boulevard (formerly known as Calle Post and PR-2R) near University of Puerto Rico at Mayagüez, to Puerto Rico Highway 106. It has not an intersection to the main highway PR-2, but can be accessed quickly going west of the alt route. It is also the main highway to the Palacio de Recreación y Deportes (Sports and Recreation Palace) and to the Parque de los Próceres.

Major intersections

See also

 List of highways numbered 65

References

External links
 

065
Roads in Mayagüez, Puerto Rico